Nicolae Linca (1 January 1929 – 27 June 2008) was a Romanian amateur welterweight boxer. After winning bronze medals at the 1953 and 1955 European championships, he became Romania's first Olympic champion in boxing at the 1956 Summer Olympics. Fighting with a broken finger, he won against Fred Tiedt in a 3:2 split decision. Today, he remains the only Romanian boxer to win gold at the Olympics. His amateur record upon retirement was 281-25. After competing as an amateur, Linca turned to coaching in the sport. By the 1990s he was living in poverty and suffering from Parkinson's and Alzheimer's diseases, which led to his deaths at the age of 79. In 2005 he was awarded the Sports Merit Order of First Class.

Highlights

References

External links

1949 Romanian National Championships
1950 Romanian National Championships
1951 Romanian National Championships
1952 Romanian National Championships
1953 Romanian National Championships
1958 Romanian National Championships
1960 Romanian National Championships

1929 births
2008 deaths
Olympic boxers of Romania
Olympic gold medalists for Romania
Boxers at the 1956 Summer Olympics
People from Blaj
Boxers at the 1952 Summer Olympics
Olympic medalists in boxing
Romanian male boxers
Medalists at the 1956 Summer Olympics
Welterweight boxers